Kozielec can refer to:
 Kozielec, a village in Bydgoszcz County, Kuyavian-Pomeranian Voivodeship, Poland
 Kozielec, a village in Świecie County, Kuyavian-Pomeranian Voivodeship, Poland
 Kozielec (Kozelets), an urban-type settlement in Chernihiv Oblast, Ukraine